Prevalle is a comune in the province of Brescia, in Lombardy. Neighbouring communes are Nuvolento, Paitone, Gavardo, Calvagese della Riviera, Muscoline and Bedizzole.

References

Cities and towns in Lombardy